Halloween Screams: A Villainous Surprise in the Skies is a Halloween-themed fireworks show that is presented at Disneyland during the seasonal Mickey's Halloween Party event. Based on the similarly-themed, former fireworks show HalloWishes at Magic Kingdom, Halloween Screams is hosted by Jack Skellington and features appearances from Disney Villains and music from Disney animated features.

History
The show was produced by Walt Disney Creative Entertainment, and its development was supervised by Steven Davison and designer Eric Tucker. This display was held nightly in 2009, during Disneyland's Halloween Time Celebration. The show is similar to that of Walt Disney World Resort's HalloWishes and uses portions of the show's audio. The Anaheim version differs in that it is hosted by Jack Skellington from Tim Burton’s The Nightmare Before Christmas. The show ran from September 25, 2009 to November 1, 2009 (the duration of Halloween Time at the Disneyland Resort) and since 2010, it ran exclusively for Mickey's Halloween Party until 2018. On non-party nights, the current Disney fireworks show runs unless Halloween Screams was cancelled due to winds or other issues the night before and must be presented as the fireworks can't be removed from their tubes in the event of a cancellation. Beginning in 2019, when Halloween Party moved to Disney California Adventure, the fireworks spectacular will be running again for public showing for the first time since its opening year. In the 2019 season, the show was modified to run like Mickey's Mix Magic only having fireworks during select evenings and run projection only on other nights. 

On the select nights where there was high winds or weather issues which forced to cancel the fireworks part of the show, a B-show consisted of all-new low level pyrotechnics and small sized firework shells would be introduced. On other occasions, the show can still played even without fireworks as well. On September 3, 2022, Disneyland announced that the updated version of Halloween fireworks shows will return.

Show summary
The show opens with the overture from Tim Burton’s The Nightmare Before Christmas, an instrumental medley of songs from the film including "What`s This?" and "Making Christmas". Zero (Jack Skellington’s dog from the film) flies above Sleeping Beauty Castle. He is shortly joined by Jack, or rather his head (in the form of projection onto a sphere shaped balloon), located on the upper left of the castle. These projections can also be viewed along the Rivers of America, which recycle the mist screens used in Fantasmic!. There are only searchlights and projection mapping used in the show's introduction. No actual pyrotechnics are used for the first two minutes.

Jack and Zero fade into the night and the first pyrotechnics are launched when "Grim Grinning Ghosts", from the Disneyland attraction the Haunted Mansion, begins to play. Projections of rising ghosts make an appearance on the castle. The music from "Grim Grinning Ghosts" changes to an upbeat pop tempo, as synchronized isobar flames, shoot up from both sides of the castle. Then the mood is set with "This is Halloween" from The Nightmare Before Christmas.

Then Disney's most infamous villains begin to arrive, beginning with Ursula (from The Little Mermaid). The guests are serenaded with a montage of Disney's most spookiest music. Later, Oogie Boogie (from The Nightmare Before Christmas) soon follows, and arriving last is Maleficent (from Sleeping Beauty), showing guests how Halloween should really be celebrated. The party ends with Jack and Zero initiating the "scream-along" grand finale.

Soundtrack
 "Overture" (from The Nightmare Before Christmas) (Danny Elfman)
 "Grim Grinning Ghosts" (from Haunted Mansion) (Buddy Baker / X Atencio)
 "This is Halloween" (from The Nightmare Before Christmas) (Elfman)
 Ursula's Spellbound Medley:
 "Poor Unfortunate Souls" (from The Little Mermaid) (Alan Menken / Howard Ashman)
 "Cruella de Vil" (from One Hundred and One Dalmatians and its 1996 live-action remake) (Mel Leven)
 "Never Smile at a Crocodile" (from Peter Pan) (Frank Churchill / Jack Lawrence)
 "The Elegant Captain Hook" (from Peter Pan) (Sammy Cahn)
 "The Skeleton Dance" (from the Silly Symphonies short, The Skeleton Dance) (Edvard Grieg, adapted by Carl Stalling)
 "Trust In Me" (from The Jungle Book) (The Sherman Brothers) mixed in with "AEIOU" (from Alice in Wonderland) (Oliver Wallace / Ted Sears)
 "Heffalumps and Woozles" (from Winnie the Pooh and the Blustery Day) (The Sherman Brothers)
 "Pink Elephants on Parade" (from Dumbo) (Wallace / Ned Washington)
 "Who's Afraid of the Big, Bad Wolf?" (from The Three Little Pigs) (Churchill)
 Oogie Boogie's Underground Casino Lair:
"Oogie Boogie's Song" (from The Nightmare Before Christmas) (Elfman)
Maleficent's Visit:
"Night on Bald Mountain" (from Fantasia; voice over by Maleficent) (Modest Mussorgsky)×
"Hellfire" (from The Hunchback of Notre Dame) (Menken)×
 Reprise of "This is Halloween" and "Grim Grinning Ghosts" in a "Scream-Along" medley finale
 "I Put a Spell on You" (lyrics from Hocus Pocus) (written by Screamin' Jay Hawkins; plays as the exit music for the show)

× — Instrumental version is played.

Voice cast
 Chris Sarandon as Jack Skellington 
 Pat Carroll as Ursula the Sea Witch
 Ken Page as Oogie Boogie
 Susan Blakeslee as Maleficent

Miscellaneous
The projections used on the sphere to the upper left of the castle were later used as projections on the Fantasmic! mist screens at the Rivers of America during the show. The decision to have video playback during the fireworks was made in October 2009. In 2015, the projectors installed for Disneyland Forever at the castle were also utilized. Not only are they an addition to the show, they are also used to project various images during the party hours. Projections used on the sphere were modified as well.

In 2018, the last year of the show exclusive to Mickey's Halloween Party, the projections were expanded to across the park with Main Street U.S.A. now using the projection mapping and searchlights to accommodate the show's viewing.

The show was formerly only performed during Mickey's Halloween Party, for party guests only. On occasions where the show is cancelled during the Halloween Party, the show is presented the next night, even if this is not a party night, as the fireworks cannot be taken out from the launch tubes to be saved for another night.

The 2019 showing of the show was the first public showing in decades since the opening year in 2009 after Halloween Party moved to Disney California Adventure. The show saw many changes:
 In Sleeping Beauty Castle, Main Street USA, and It's a Small World, there are new projections in many scenes of the show.
 In Rivers of America, the show was enhanced and utilized with fountains, lasers, new projections in the area, and searchlights, which were also used for many firework shows such as Together Forever (first firework show to have this technology), Believe... In Holiday Magic, Mickey's Mix Magic, and 2019 version of Disneyland Forever.
 There were more fireworks than in the previous year of showing for select nights (mainly Friday to Sunday) and more of lasers (albeit without fireworks) which were used in other weeknights.

See also
 HalloWishes
 Disney's Nightmare in the Sky

References
 Halloween Time at the Disneyland Resort

External links
 
 
 Jack and the Castle (photo)

Disneyland
Walt Disney Parks and Resorts fireworks
The Nightmare Before Christmas
Haunted Mansion
Fireworks in the United States
Halloween events in the United States